Orpington's municipal elections were held on 10 May 1962. One third of the council was up for election. The elections took place just under two months after the Liberals had won the 1962 Orpington by-election.

Election result

The Liberal share of the vote matched that achieved in the Orpington by-election two months earlier. The result had the following consequences for the total number of seats on the council after the elections:

The Conservatives lost their majority and went into opposition. The Liberals won a majority taking control of the council for the first time.

Ward result

Includes by-election caused by the resignation of Councillor Eric Lubbock.

References

1962 English local elections
Council elections in Kent
1960s in Kent